Alice Mackenzie (née McKenzie) (1873–1963) was a 19th-century New Zealand author, settler and poet known for her book The Pioneers of Martins Bay describing her early life at Martins Bay, New Zealand in the 1870s and 1880s and supposed sighting of the extinct flightless bird the Moa.

The Pioneers of Martins Bay
The Pioneers of Martins Bay is a historical book by Mackenzie, describing her early life at Martins Bay in the 1870s and 1880s.

As a child, McKenzie and her family moved from Hokitika to Jackson Bay in Westland. After that they moved to Jamestown on Lake McKerrow. The township of Jamestown flopped and the McKenzies drifted down to Martins Bay. The hardships and isolation that followed the move are innumerable. Alice grew up in these isolated and lonely conditions and grew up to write the book.

The book was first published in 1947 by the Southland Historical Committee, and a revised edition was self-published in 1952.

Moa sighting

McKenzie grew up in what was then New Zealand's most remote settlement Martins Bay, then part of Otago, but now part of Fiordland National Park. In 1880, as an eight-year-old, Alice had a meeting with a large bird that she believed had been a takahe for many years. 

"It was lying on the sand, sunning itself.

"I got nearer and nearer until I sat down on the sand behind it. I remember stroking its back. It had no tail.

"It just lay there, it was quite quiet. So I put my hand underneath it and drew out one of its legs. It took no notice of me. I started to tie the flax around it, I thought I'd tie it up.

"Then it got up and made a harsh, grunting cry and bit at me. And I ran as hard as I could over the sandhills towards the sea. I thought if I went down to the sea it mightn't follow me into the water. I never looked behind, it never came very far with me.

"When I got home and told my father he came to have a look. But the bird was gone when he came. He saw its tracks where it had followed me from the top of the sandhills but it didn't go over them.

"He had a foot-rule in his pocket and he measured the tracks. From the heel to the middle toe was 11 inches."

In Connected 2013 level 2 - I Spy... an article called What Alice Saw by Don Long and illustrated by Adele Jackson looked at Mackenzie's Moa sighting.

Bibliography 
The Pioneers of Martins Bay
 Poems

References

1873 births
1963 deaths
Date of birth missing
Date of death missing
Settlers of Otago
Fiordland
People from the West Coast, New Zealand
New Zealand women poets